Halensee is a locality (Ortsteil) of Berlin in the district (Bezirk) of Charlottenburg-Wilmersdorf. Halensee was established as a villa and tenement settlement in about 1880, in the suburb of Wilmersdorf, which became part of Greater Berlin in 1920. In 2004, Halensee became its own Ortsteil. With an area of 1.27 km2 it is the smallest Ortsteil in Berlin after Hansaviertel.

History 
Halensee was the site of the German shooting championship in 1921. On 26 September, one Jannich won the competition firing an Ortgies semi-automatic pistol.

Geography 
The locality, the smallest of the Charlottenburg-Wilmersdorf district, is situated in its centre and borders with Charlottenburg, Wilmersdorf, Schmargendorf, Grunewald and Westend.

It is bounded by the Bundesautobahn 100 (Stadtring) in the west and the Cicerostraße, a branch-off of the Kurfürstendamm in the east. The locality is named after the small , which however is part of the neighbouring Grunewald locality.

Transport 
Halensee is served at Berlin-Halensee station and Berlin-Hohenzollerndamm station by the Berlin S-Bahn lines S4 (the circular Ringbahn) and S46.

Education 

Halensee-Grundschule, a primary school, is in Halensee.

The Japanische Ergänzungsschule in Berlin e.V. (ベルリン日本語補習授業校 Berurin Nihongo Hoshū Jugyō Kō), a weekend Japanese supplementary school, is held at Halensee-Grundschule.

Photo gallery

See also 
 Electromote

References

External links 

Localities of Berlin

1880 establishments in Germany